The following is a list of acts who have recorded either on Curb Records, Bruc Records, Asylum-Curb or Word Records. An * marks an artist no longer recording for the label.

#-B

4HIM*
About a Mile (Word-Curb)
Susie Allanson
Airkraft* 
American Young
Meredith Andrews
Paul Anka*
Eddy Arnold*
Rodney Atkins
Baker & Myers*
Bananarama*
Bandit Brothers*
BarlowGirl*
The Beat Farmers*
The Bellamy Brothers*  (Curb, formerly on Curb/Warner Bros., Curb/Elektra, Curb/MCA)
Mary Black
Blake & Brian*
Blue County*
Bomshel*
Debby Boone*
Tony Booth
Boy Howdy*
Lee Brice 
Lisa Brokop*
Junior Brown*
Keith Brown*
T. Graham Brown*
Jann Browne*
Sherry Bryce* (MGM/Curb)
Billy Burnette*
Burnin' Daylight*
Billy Currington*

C-E

Cactus Choir*
Jeff Carson*
Shaun Cassidy* (Warner/Curb)
Cee Cee Chapman*
Donovan Chapman*
Petula Clark*
The Clark Family Experience*
Philip Claypool*
Cowboy Crush* (Asylum-Curb)
Mike Curb Congregation
Billy Ray Cyrus* (Word/Warner/Curb)
Amy Dalley*
Star De Azlan
Billy Dean (Asylum-Curb)
The Desert Rose Band* (MCA/Curb)
deSoL*
The Driven
Michael English
Exile* (Warner Bros./Curb)
Eyes*

F-H

Fisk Jubilee Singers
Florida Georgia Line
Fun Factory*
Francesca Battistelli (Fervent/Curb)
Leif Garrett*
Gloria Gaynor*
Ashley Gearing (Asylum-Curb)
Don Gibson*
Bobby Goldsboro*
Amy Grant* (Word/Warner/Curb)
Natalie Grant
Lee Greenwood*
Gregorian*
Group 1 Crew*
Merle Haggard*
Brad Hawkins*
Steve Holy*
Ray Hood* (Caption/Curb)
Mallary Hope
James T. Horn* (Curb/Universal)

J-L

Jana
JJ White*
Cledus T. Judd* (Asylum-Curb)
The Judds* (RCA/Curb, MCA/Curb, Mercury/Curb)
Just Jinjer
Wynonna Judd (Asylum-Curb; formerly on MCA/Curb, Universal/Curb, and Mercury/Curb)
Kaci
The Kendalls*
Brian Kennedy
David Kersh*
Hal Ketchum*
Jesse Kinch
Bill LaBounty* (Warner Bros./Curb)
Rachael Lampa* (Word/Warner/Curb)
Kimberley Locke*
Josh Logan*
Lyle Lovett (Lost Highway/Curb, formerly on MCA/Curb)
Ruby Lovett*

M-O

Shane McAnally*
C. W. McCall*
Delbert McClinton* (Curb, Rising Tide/Curb)
Ronnie McDowell*
Tim McGraw*
Ken Mellons*
MercyMe*
Jo Dee Messina*
Marie Miller
Nemesis
Heidi Newfield*
Jerrod Niemann
The Nitty Gritty Dirt Band*
OBB
Fernando Ortega (Word/Warner/Curb)
Donny Osmond*
Marie Osmond* (Capitol/Curb)
The Osmonds*
Buck Owens*

P-S

Perfect Stranger*
Keith Perry*
Jonathan Pierce
Pink Lady* (Elektra/Curb)
Mo Pitney
Plumb
Point of Grace
pureNRG
LeAnn Rimes*
Rio Grand 
Kenny Rogers*
Nate Sallie*
Dylan Scott (Curb/Sidewalk)
Nicol Sponberg* (aka Nicol Smith)
Sawyer Brown* (initially on Capitol/Curb)
Selah (including Nicol Spongberg, Melodie Crittenden, and Amy Perry)
Seminole* (Curb/Universal)
T. G. Sheppard* (Warner Bros./Curb)
Six Shooter*
Sixpence None the Richer*
Jamie Slocum
Todd Smith
Smokin' Armadillos*
Jeffrey Steele*
Ray Stevens*  (initially on Capitol/Curb)

T-W

B.J. Thomas*
Mel Tillis*
Tony Toliver* (Curb/Rising Tide)
Tompall & The Glaser Brothers* (including Chuck, Jim, and Tompall Glaser) (MGM/Curb)
Randy Travis (Word/Warner/Curb)
Trick Pony* (Asylum-Curb)
Trini Triggs
Rick Vincent*
Clay Walker (Asylum-Curb)
Tamara Walker*
Dale Watson*
Gene Watson*
Whigfield*
The Whites*
Hank Williams, Jr.*  (Elektra-Curb, formerly on Warner Bros./Curb)
Hank Williams III* (Bruc, formerly on Curb)
Stephanie Winslow* (Warner Bros./Curb)

Y-Z

Billy Yates*
Pia Zadora*

Lists of recording artists by label